Steel City Wanderers Ladies Football Club is an English women's football club based in Sheffield, South Yorkshire.

History
The club was formed in 1993 as Loxley Girls, changing to Steel City Wanderers two years later. The club has just recently moved from Hillsborough, Sheffield and is now based at SGP Thorncliffe, High Green, Sheffield.

The club has played in the Women's FA Cup on several occasions.

The junior teams play in Sheffield & Hallamshire Girls County League.

References

External links
Official site
 http://www.shgcl.co.uk/leaguesquad.php?clubid=NTI=

Women's football clubs in England
Football clubs in South Yorkshire
1993 establishments in England
FA Women's National League teams
Sheffield & Hallamshire County FA members
Sports teams and clubs in Sheffield